YCK may refer to:

Yio Chu Kang, a subzone of Ang Mo Kio Planning Area in Singapore
Yio Chu Kang MRT station (MRT station abbreviation), a mass rapid transit station in Ang Mo Kio, Singapore
York City Knights, an English professional rugby league club